New Shepard is a fully reusable suborbital launch vehicle developed by Blue Origin for space tourism. The vehicle is named after Alan Shepard, the first American astronaut in space. The vehicle is capable of vertical takeoff and vertical landing, and can carry a crew.

The first uncrewed test flight of the New Shepard vehicle was in 2015. Blue Origin began testing prototype engines and vehicles in 2006 and completed full-scale engine development in 2015. Testing continued in 2016 and 2017, and Blue Origin planned its first crewed test flight for 2018, but it was delayed until 2021. As of 4 August 2022, New Shepard has flown 32 passengers into space. Tickets for commercial flights began to be sold on May 5, 2021, for flights carrying up to six people.

New Shepard is a one-stage rocket consisting of a crew capsule and a booster rocket. The capsule can seat six passengers. The booster rocket, powered by a BE-3 liquid hydrogen and liquid oxygen engine, propels the capsule to an altitude of over 100 km, where passengers can experience a few minutes of weightlessness before the capsule returns to Earth.

The vehicle is designed to be fully reusable, with the capsule and booster rocket returning to Earth via parachute and landing vertically on the ground. This allows Blue Origin to significantly reduce the cost of space tourism, making the experience more accessible to the general public. Blue Origin has successfully launched and landed the New Shepard vehicle 21 times.

History

Early Blue Origin vehicle and engine development 

The first development vehicle of the New Shepard development program was a sub-scale demonstration vehicle named Goddard, built in 2006 following earlier engine development efforts by Blue Origin. Goddard made its first flight on 13 November 2006.

The Goddard launch vehicle was assembled at the Blue Origin facility near Seattle, Washington. Blue Origin Project Manager Rob Meyerson has said that they selected Texas as the launch site particularly because of the state's historical connections to the aerospace industry, although that industry is not located near the planned launch site, and the vehicle will not be manufactured in Texas.

On the path to developing New Shepard, a crew capsule was also needed, and design was begun on a space capsule in the early 2000s. One development milestone along the way became public. On 19 October 2012, Blue Origin conducted a successful pad escape of a full-scale suborbital crew capsule at its West Texas launch site. For the test, the capsule fired its pusher escape motor and launched from a launch vehicle simulator. The Crew Capsule traveled to an altitude of  under active thrust vector control before descending safely by parachute to a soft landing  downrange.

In April 2015, Blue Origin announced that they had completed acceptance testing of the BE-3 engine that would power the larger New Shepard vehicle. Blue Origin also announced that they intended to begin flight testing of the New Shepard later in 2015, with initial flights occurring as frequently as monthly, with "a series of dozens of flights over the extent of the suborbital test program [taking] a couple of years to complete". The same month, the FAA announced that the regulatory paperwork for the test program had already been filed and approved, and test flights were expected to begin before mid-May 2015.

By February 2016, three New Shepard vehicles had been built. The first was lost in a test in April 2015, the second had flown twice (see below), and the third was completing manufacture at the Blue Origin factory in Kent, Washington.

In 2016, the Blue Origin team were awarded the Collier Trophy for demonstrating rocket booster reusability with the New Shepard human spaceflight vehicle.

Flight test program 

A multi-year program of flight tests was begun in 2015 and continued into 2021. By mid-2016, the test program was sufficiently advanced that Blue Origin began flying suborbital research payloads for universities and NASA. The flight-test program was completed in early 2021 and the first flight carrying passengers to suborbital space occurred in July 2021.

New Shepard 1 
While the test flight itself was deemed a success, and the capsule was successfully recovered via parachute landing, the booster crash landed and was not recovered due to a failure of hydraulic pressure in the vehicle control system during descent. The capsule was called RSS Jules Verne.

New Shepard 2 

The New Shepard 2 (NS2), also called "Tail 2", flight test article propulsion module made five successful flights in 2015 and 2016, being retired after its fifth flight in October 2016.

First vertical soft landing 
After the loss of NS1, a second New Shepard vehicle was built, NS2. Its first flight, and the second test flight of New Shepard overall, was carried out on 23 November 2015, reaching  altitude with successful recovery of both capsule and booster stage. The booster rocket successfully performed a powered vertical landing. This was the first such successful rocket vertical landing on Earth after travelling higher than  that the McDonnell Douglas DC-XA achieved in the 1990s, and first after sending something into space. Jeff Bezos was quoted as saying that Blue Origin planned to use the same architecture of New Shepard for the booster stage of their orbital vehicle.

Second vertical soft landing 
On 22 January 2016, Blue Origin successfully repeated the flight profile of 23 November 2015 launch with the same New Shepard vehicle. This accomplishment demonstrated re-usability of New Shepard and a turnaround time of 61 days.

Third vertical soft landing 
On 2 April 2016, the same New Shepard booster flew for a third time, reaching , before returning successfully.

Fourth vertical soft landing 

The two parachutes "slowed the descent to 23 mph, as opposed to the usual 16 mph with three parachutes". Crushable bumpers are used to further reduce the landing shock through energy-absorbing deformation.

Fifth and final flight test 
A fifth and final test flight of the NS2 propulsion module was conducted on 5 October 2016. The principal objective was to boost the passenger module to the point of highest dynamic pressure at transonic velocity and conduct a flight test of the in-flight abort system. Due to subsequent buffet and forces that impact the propulsion module after the high velocity separation of the passenger capsule that are outside the design region of the PM, NS2 was not expected to survive and land, and if it did, Blue Origin had stated that NS2 would be retired and become a museum item. In the event, the flight test was successful. The abort occurred, and NS2 remained stable after the capsule abort test, completed its ascent to space, and successfully landed for a fifth and final time.

New Shepard 3 
New Shepard 3 (NS3), also called "Tail 3", along with capsule RSS H. G. Wells, was modified for increased reusability and improved thermal protection; it includes a redesigned propulsion module and the inclusion of new access panels for more rapid servicing and improved thermal protection. NS3 is the third propulsion module built. It was completed and shipped to the launch site by September 2017, although parts of it had been built as early as March 2016. Flight tests began in 2017 and continued into 2019. The new Crew Capsule 2.0, featuring windows, is integrated to the NS3. NS3 will only ever be used to fly cargo; no passengers will be carried.

Its initial flight test occurred on 12 December 2017. This was the first flight flown under the regulatory regime of a launch license granted by the US Federal Aviation Administration. Previous test flights had flown under an experimental permit, which did not allow Blue Origin to carry cargo for which it is paid for commercially. This made the flight of NS3 the first revenue flight for payloads, and it carried 12 experiments on the flight, as well as a test dummy given the moniker "Mannequin Skywalker."

Since the maiden flight, "Blue Origin has been making updates to the vehicle ... intended primarily to improve operability rather than performance or reliability. Those upgrades took longer than expected" leading to a several-month gap in test flights. The second test flight took place on 29 April 2018. The 10th overall New Shepard flight, and the fourth NS3 flight, had originally been planned for December 2018, but was delayed due to "ground infrastructure issues." Following a diagnostics of the initial issue, Blue Origin rescheduled the launch for early 2019, after discovering "additional systems" that needed repairs as well. It has been used to test SPLICE ("Safe and Precise Landing – Integrated Capabilities Evolution"), a NASA lunar landing technology demonstration, on two separate flights in October 2020 (NS-13) and August 2021 (NS-17). 

New Shepard 3 was destroyed during the NS-23 mission once it impacted the ground on 12 September 2022 after a booster engine anomaly led to the activation of the in-flight abort system. This was the ninth flight of NS3, and the flight was not carrying any people on board.

New Shepard 4 
New Shepard 4 (NS4), also called "Tail 4", which flies with capsule RSS First Step, was the fourth propulsion module to be built and the first to carry human passengers. Bezos himself was a passenger. The vehicle was manufactured in 2018 and moved to the Blue Origin West Texas launch facility in December 2019. The uncrewed maiden launch of NS4 occurred on 14 January 2021. NS4 was successfully launched on 20 July 2021, with four passengers; Jeff Bezos was aboard this maiden crewed flight. On 13 October 2021, NS4 successfully launched and landed, carrying four passengers, including notable passenger William Shatner. On 11 December 2021, the Blue Origin NS-19 successfully launched into space. The ship's passengers included NFL legend and television personality Michael Strahan, Alan Shepard's daughter Laura Shepard Churchley, who flew into space 60 years after her father's flight, and four other people. This was the first time New Shepard carried six passengers, the full design passenger complement. The fourth crewed flight took place 31 March 2022, with a Blue Origin employee and five other passengers on board. The fifth crewed flight took place 4 June 2022, and the sixth crewed flight took place 4 August 2022.

Crewed flights 
In June 2018, the company announced that while it continued to plan to fly initial internal passengers later in 2018, it would not be selling commercial tickets for New Shepard until 2019 but the first commercial crewed flight was delayed until 2021.

Blue Origin commenced the first flight carrying passengers on the 16th flight of New Shepard (NS-16) on 20 July 2021. However, due to scheduling problems, the $28M auction winner did not participate in the NS-16 flight. The $28M auction winner was rescheduled to fly at a later flight. The passengers aboard the NS-16 flight on 20 July 2021 were Jeff Bezos, Mark Bezos, Wally Funk and Oliver Daemen. At 82 years old Funk was the oldest person, and at 18 Daemen was the youngest, to travel into space. Daemen got the commercial seat that the $28M auction winner did not use. Daemen's flight was paid for by his father Joes Daemen, who, after the anonymous $28M auction winner dropped out of the flight, was able to secure the seat on the flight due to being the second highest bidder on the auction. Joes paid for the seat and gave it to his son, thus making Oliver Daemen the first commercial passenger of New Shepard. On 22 December 2021, it was made public that the $28 million mystery auction winner was Justin Sun, a Chinese cryptocurrency entrepreneur. The $28 million he bid was paid to Blue Origin, who in turn gave it to their charity Club for the Future, which in turn distributed most of the money to other space-related nonprofit organizations. Instead of flying on the flight in July 2021 to which he won the auctioned seat, Mr. Sun has agreed with Blue Origin to Mr. Sun buying (presumably with the $28 million that has already been paid to Blue Origin) a dedicated New Shepard flight in 2022. Mr. Sun will choose five passengers to accompany him on this flight in late 2022.

The second crewed flight took place on 13 October 2021, carrying four passengers, two of whom were paying passengers. The flight included the actor William Shatner who flew as "guest" of Blue Origin (i.e., he did not pay for his flight). 

On 11 December 2021, the third crewed flight, Blue Origin NS-19, successfully launched into space. The ship's passengers included NFL legend and television personality Michael Strahan and Alan Shepard's daughter Laura Shepard Churchley as "guests" of Blue Origin (i.e., they did not pay for their flights), and four other people who were paying passengers. 

The fourth crewed flight, Blue Origin NS-20, flew successfully on 31 March 2022. Onboard was Gary Lai, a Blue Origin employee and five paying passengers. This was the first flight with no celebrity passengers. 

The fifth crewed flight, Blue Origin NS-21, flew successfully on 4 June 2022. Onboard was educational YouTuber Katya Echazarreta, whose flight had been partly sponsored by Blue Origin, and partly by other sources, and five other paying passengers (it could be that it has been mistakenly claimed that Echazarreta's flight was sponsored by Blue Origin and instead it was fully sponsored by Space for Humanity, a nonprofit organization). Also onboard was Blue Origin's first repeat customer for New Shepard launches, Evan Dick. 

The 6th crewed flight took place 4 August 2022. Among the passengers was Coby Cotton, one of the founders of the popular YouTube channel Dude Perfect. His flight was paid for by the organization MoonDAO, which works in cryptocurrency to "decentralize access to space", and bought two seats from Blue Origin. One of the seats was used by Cotton and one to be used in the future by Kejun Yan. It was reported that MoonDAO had paid about $2.5 million for the two seats on Blue Origin flights, or $1.25 million per seat. This is the first public figure available for the price to ride a Blue Origin rocket to suborbital space (not counting the $28 million winning bid in the auction for a seat on the first flight). However, Blue Origin does not charge all their passengers the same price, but tailors the price individually to each passenger, so it is hard to define the "ticket price" for New Shepard. Also on the 4 August 2022 flight were the first space travellers of Egyptian and Portuguese origin, and the flight was the first flight (it may have been that the previous flight Blue Origin NS-21 on 4 June 2022 was actually the first such flight, if Katya Echazarreta's flight was not sponsored by Blue Origin, see above) where all six passengers were paying passengers (i.e., their flights were financed by other entities than Blue Origin).

Up to late June 2022 (after the fifth crewed flight Blue Origin NS-21), Blue Origin has generated more than $100 million from the New Shepard space tourism program.

Flight list

Design 

The New Shepard is a fully reusable, vertical takeoff, vertical landing (VTVL) space vehicle composed of two principal parts: a pressurized crew capsule and a booster rocket that Blue Origin calls a propulsion module. The New Shepard is controlled entirely by on-board computers, without ground control or a human pilot.

Crew capsule 
The New Shepard Crew Capsule is a pressurized crew capsule that can carry six people, and supports a "full-envelope" launch escape system that can separate the capsule from the booster rocket anywhere during the ascent. The Crew Capsule Escape Solid Rocket Motor (CCE-SRM) is sourced from Aerojet Rocketdyne. After separation two or three parachutes deploy. Just before landing, retro rockets fire. (see Fourth vertical soft landing (19 June 2016) above)

Propulsion module 
The New Shepard propulsion module is powered using a Blue Origin BE-3 bipropellant rocket engine burning liquid hydrogen and liquid oxygen, although some early development work was done by Blue Origin on engines operating with other propellants: the BE-1 engine using monopropellant hydrogen peroxide; and the BE-2 engine using high-test peroxide oxidizer and RP-1 kerosene fuel.

Flight profile 
After reaching apogee the vehicle performs a descent and restart its main engines a few tens of seconds before vertical landing, close to its launch site. The total flight duration of the rocket is over 7 minutes.

The crewed variant features a separate crew module that separates close to peak altitude, and the propulsion module performs a powered landing while the crew module lands under parachutes. Total flight time is 10 minutes. The crew module can also separate in case of vehicle malfunction or other emergency using solid propellant separation boosters and perform a parachute landing.

Development 
Initial low altitude flight testing (up to ) with subscale prototypes of the New Shepard was scheduled for the fourth quarter of 2006. This was later confirmed to have occurred in November 2006 in a press release by Blue Origin. The prototype flight test program could involve up to ten flights. Incremental flight testing to 100 km altitude was planned to be carried out between 2007 and 2009 with increasingly larger and more capable prototypes. The full-scale vehicle was initially expected to be operational for revenue service as early as 2010, though that goal was not met and the first full-scale test flight of a New Shepard vehicle was successfully completed 2015, with commercial service currently aimed for no earlier than 2020. The vehicle could fly up to 50 times a year. Clearance from the FAA was needed before test flights began, and a separate license is needed before commercial operations begin. Blue Origin held a public meeting on 15 June 2006 in Van Horn, as part of the public comment opportunity needed to secure FAA permissions. Blue Origin projected in 2006 that once cleared for commercial operation, they would expect to conduct a maximum rate of 52 launches per year from West Texas. The RLV would carry three or more passengers per operation.

Prototype test vehicle 

An initial flight test of a prototype vehicle took place on 13 November 2006 at 6:30 am local time (12:30 UTC); an earlier flight on the 10th being canceled due to winds. This marked the first developmental test flight undertaken by Blue Origin. The flight was by the first prototype vehicle, known as Goddard. Videos are available on the Blue Origin website and elsewhere.

Second test vehicle 
A second test vehicle made two flights in 2011. The first flight was a short hop (low altitude, VTVL takeoff and landing mission) flown on 6 May 2011. The vehicle is known only as "PM2" as of August 2011, gleaned from information the company filed with the FAA prior to its late August high-altitude, high-velocity second test flight. Media have speculated this might mean "Propulsion Module".

This vehicle was flown a second time on a 24 August 2011 test flight, in west Texas. It failed when ground personnel lost contact and control of the vehicle. The company recovered remnants of the craft from ground search. On 2 September 2011, Blue Origin released the results of the cause of the test vehicle failure. As the vehicle reached Mach 1.2 and  altitude, a "flight instability drove an angle of attack that triggered [the] range safety system to terminate thrust on the vehicle."

Involvement with NASA Commercial Crew Development Program 
Additionally, Blue Origin received US$3.7 million in Commercial Crew Development (CCDev) phase 1 to advance several development objectives of its innovative "pusher" Launch Abort System (LAS) and composite pressure vessel.

, with the end of the second ground test, Blue Origin completed all work envisioned under the phase 1 contract for the pusher escape system. They also "completed work on the other aspect of its award, risk reduction work on a composite pressure vessel" for the vehicle.

Commercial suborbital flights

Passenger flights 

Following the fifth and final test flight of the NS2 booster and test capsule in October 2016, Blue Origin indicated that they were on track for flying test astronauts by the end of 2017, and beginning commercial suborbital passenger flights in 2018. After fifteen test flights, the company flew its first four passengers in 2021 – Wally Funk, Jeff Bezos, Mark Bezos, and Oliver Daemen – on Blue Origin NS-16.

NASA suborbital research payloads 

, Blue Origin had submitted the New Shepard reusable launch vehicle for use as an uncrewed rocket for NASA's suborbital reusable launch vehicle (sRLV) solicitation under NASA's Flight Opportunities Program. Blue Origin projects  altitude in flights of approximately ten minutes duration, while carrying an  research payload. By March 2016, Blue Origin noted that they are "due to start flying unaccompanied scientific payloads later [in 2016]." On April 29th, 2018, during its eighth flight New Shepard carried the Schmitt Space Communicator SC-1x, a three-pound device developed by Solstar that launched the first commercial wi-fi hotspot service in space and sent the first commercial Twitter message from space. NASA provided a part of the $2 million project's funding as a part of its Flight Opportunities program.

On 12 September 2022, eighteen NASA payloads were flying on NS-23 when an in-flight failure of the booster's main engine caused an emergency ejection of the payload capsule. The payload capsule landed safely and was recovered whilst the booster was lost.

See also 

 
 
  2009
 
 New Glenn
 
 SpaceX reusable launch system development program
 List of crewed spacecraft

References

External links 

  
 Blue's Rocket Clues (MSNBC's Cosmic Log, 24 June 2006)
 Future & Fantasy Spaceships Primed for Launch Commercial, Orbital Spacecraft (See Page 8)
 Latest Blue Origin news on the Space Fellowship
 Secretive Spaceship Builder's Plans Hinted at in NASA Agreement Commercial Crew Development Blue Origin (2 New craft images)

Videos
 Images and videos at Blue Origin
 New Shepard space vehicle first successful soft landing, 23 November 2015 (YouTube).

Blue Origin launch vehicles
Space tourism
Private spaceflight
Reusable launch systems
VTVL rockets
Suborbital spaceflight
Vehicles introduced in 2015
Alan Shepard